Pyatts is an unincorporated community in Perry County, Illinois, United States.

References

Unincorporated communities in Perry County, Illinois
Unincorporated communities in Illinois